Ƅ (minuscule: ƅ) is a letter of the Latin alphabet used in the Zhuang alphabet from 1957 to 1986 to indicate the sixth tone, mid-level . The 'b' shape was chosen for the letter because it resembles the digit '6', and the character represents the sixth tone. In 1986, it was replaced by h.

See also
Ƨ ƨ
З з
Ч ч
Ƽ ƽ

Latin-script letters